Perla Antoine Nasr (born 17 August 2001) is a Lebanese footballer who plays as a goalkeeper for Lebanese club SAS.

International career 
Nasr made her international senior debut for Lebanon on 10 April 2021, as a second-half substitute in a friendly game against Lithuania.

Honours 
SAS
 Lebanese Women's Football League: 2018–19, 2019–20
 Lebanese Women's FA Cup: 2018–19
 WAFF Women's Clubs Championship runner-up: 2019
 Lebanese Women's Super Cup runner-up: 2018

Lebanon U18
 WAFF U-18 Women's Championship second place: 2018

See also
 List of Lebanon women's international footballers

References

External links
 
 
 

2001 births
Living people
People from Keserwan District
Lebanese women's footballers
Women's association football goalkeepers
Stars Association for Sports players
Lebanese Women's Football League players
Lebanon women's international footballers